Straits Sharks (known as Inline Framing Sharks for sponsorship reasons) is a Gibraltarian rugby team. They operate as a franchise rather than a traditional club, like all teams in the Gibraltarian domestic structure. As the name implies, the team is named after the Strait of Gibraltar

External links
Straits Sharks at Gibraltar RFU

Rugby union in Gibraltar
Rugby clubs established in 2010